The ǀKhowesin (literally queen bees, also: Witbooi Nama or Witbooi Orlam) are one of five clans of the Orlam people in Namibia. They originated from Pella in the Cape Colony in South Africa and migrated to South West Africa the 19th century, led by their Kaptein Kido Witbooi. They crossed Orange River and moved to the Fish River area living a nomadic existence. They eventually settled in what became known later as Gibeon.

References

Notes

Literature
 
 

History of Namibia
Ethnic groups in Namibia
Ethnic groups in South Africa